Gordon Douglas Nettles (born August 13, 1951) is a former professional American football defensive back.

Nettles grew up in a military family he marched with Dr. King in Albany, GA.  He was also a Boy Scout who reached the Eagle Scout rank. He also camped in Morocco because off his family living on a military base there and got chased after a gorilla. He was a High School All-American from Rutherford High, Panama City, Florida. Once ran for 315 yards and five TD's against Woodam High whose QB was David Lee, former Miami Dolphins quarterbacks 

Nettles played college football at Vanderbilt University he was one of the two African-Americans on the team the other being Walt Overton the team that played in the 1974 Peach Bowl.

Nettles played cornerback for seven seasons for the Baltimore Colts and the New York Giants of the National Football League. During his career he played cornerback and special teams. He is not married, however, Nettles lives in Silver Spring, Maryland with his daughter Asia Nettles. Asia ran track for St John's University and was part of the 4 x 200 team that set a school record at the Penn Relays.

He worked 18 years in medical sales. He was a fifth grade history teacher and fifth grade football coach until the end of the 2019 school year. He also coached lower school track at Landon School in Bethesda, Maryland.

1951 births
Living people
People from Panama City, Florida
Players of American football from Florida
American football cornerbacks
Vanderbilt Commodores football players
Baltimore Colts players
New York Giants players